Cyperus sexflorus is a sedge of the family Cyperaceae that is native to Australia.

It blooms between January and July, producing brown flowers.

In Western Australia it is found amongst sandstone rocks in the Kimberley region where it grows in sandy soils. It is also found across the top end of the Northern Territory.

See also
List of Cyperus species

References

Plants described in 1810
Flora of Western Australia
Flora of the Northern Territory
sexflorus
Taxa named by Robert Brown (botanist, born 1773)